The following highways are numbered 687:

United States